Pedro Antonio Palacio Cruz is a Colombian actor known for his role as Anival Conrado in Chepe Fortuna.

History
Palacio was born in Barranquilla, located north of Colombia on the Atlantic coast. He began his career in 2002 as an actor in Protagonistas de novela - Colombia, a reality show.  In 2003, he was hired for the soap opera La costeña y el cachaco in the role of Kike.

Filmography

External links
Pagina de Pedro Palacio (In Spanish!)
Pedro Palacio (In Spanish!)

1978 births
Living people
21st-century Colombian male actors
Colombian male telenovela actors
Participants in Colombian reality television series
People from Barranquilla